The Institute of Revolutionary Practice is an educational institution established in 1949, and affiliated with the Kuomintang.

History
On 8 July 1949, Chiang Kai-shek and a group of Kuomintang leaders, among them Chang Chi-yun, Ku Cheng-kang, and Sun Li-jen, founded the Institute of Revolutionary Practice. The institute published its own newsletter, Practice, the first issue of which was dated 15 October 1949. The institute's first students were admitted on 16 October 1949. During the 1950s, Chiang Kai-shek attempted to reform the Kuomintang, so that its members were loyal to him. The trainees at the Institute of Revolutionary Practice and other programs were a part of this reform. While in a leadership position at the school, Chiang Ching-kuo relied on his role to build his political influence with younger party members, who trained there to become mid- to high-level members of the Kuomintang. The institution was known as the National Development and Research Institute between October 1999 and 2017, when it returned to its original name. The institute resumed training sessions in July 2020, twenty years after they had been suspended.

The institute is located in the Muzha portion of Wenshan District in Taipei, on a plot of land known as Zhongxing Shanzhuang. The Kuomintang acquired the land on which the property is located in 1964. A portion of the plot was sold to the Yuanlih Group in August 2005 for NT$4.25 billion. In 2014, portions of the institute's premises were designated by the Taipei City Government as historic buildings.

Kuomintang chairman Johnny Chiang stated in 2020 that the institute's directorship is an unpaid and "obligatory post".

Structure
Kuomintang Youth League
Research Department
Teaching Department

Leaders
Chiang Kai-shek (16 October 1949 – 31 October 1949)
Chen Cheng (31 October 1949 – 21 May 1950)
 (21 May 1950 – 1954)
 (26 June 1954 – 25 September 1954)
Chiang Kai-shek (May 1956 – 1958)
Chang Chi-yun (1958–1972)
Yuan Shouqian (1963–1967)
Lee Huan (6 August 1975 – 14 June 1978)
 (14 June 1978 – January 1988)
Lee Teng-hui (January 1988 – December 1988)
Chuang Huai-yi (from 1994)
Tsai Bih-hwang (December 1997 – August 2002)
John Kuan (2002–2005)
Chen Ta-tai (24 July 2009 – 4 September 2011)
 (until 12 February 2014)
Kuo Shou-wang (May 2014 – January 2015) 
Jimmy Wu (February 2015 – March 2016)
Lin Chung-shan (June 2016 – July 2017)
 September 2017 – 25 March 2020)
Lo Chih-chiang (since 26 March 2020)

References

Kuomintang
1949 establishments in Taiwan
Educational institutions established in 1949
Schools in Taipei